Maurice "Mo" Smith (born 17 December 1959) is an American racing driver. He is the reigning champion of the European Le Mans Series in the LMP3 class.

Racing record

Racing career summary 

† As Smith was a guest driver, he was ineligible to score points.

Complete European Le Mans Series results 
(key) (Races in bold indicate pole position; results in italics indicate fastest lap)

References

External links 

 

1959 births
Living people
American racing drivers
European Le Mans Series drivers
Le Mans Cup drivers